Fudbalski klub Željezničar Sarajevo is a professional football club based in Sarajevo, Bosnia and Herzegovina.

The first ever involvement of the club in European competitions was in the 1963 Mitropa Cup.

History
FK Željezničar Sarajevo is a professional football club based in Grbavica in Novo Sarajevo; a municipality in the capital city Sarajevo, Bosnia and Herzegovina. The club's first ever European match was against Austria Wien in the 1963 Mitropa Cup. Željezničar is most famous for becoming the first Bosnian football club to reach both the UEFA Cup (now named UEFA Europa League) semi-finals during the 1984–85 season and the quarter-finals during the 1971–72 season, and one of the first few clubs ever to do so from the former Yugoslavia.

In modern times, the clubs best finish in European competitions was reaching the 2002–03 Champions League third qualifying round, losing to Newcastle United.

From 1998 to 2015, Željezničar played its home European matches at the nation's largest Olympic stadium, Asim Ferhatović Hase Stadium (also known as the Koševo Stadium), as their traditional home stadium, Grbavica Stadium, did not meet UEFA requirements. Since recent renovations at Grbavica, the club has been playing its home matches back at their home ground since July 2017.

European record

P = Matches played; W = Matches won; D = Matches drawn; L = Matches lost; GF = Goals for; GA = Goals against; GD = Goals difference. Defunct competitions indicated in italics.

Best results in European competitions

List of matches

1960s–1990

1990–present

See also

FK Željezničar Sarajevo
Bosnian football clubs in European competitions
Yugoslav First League - Best finish in Europe by club

References

External links

Official website 
Official supporters' website 
FK Željezničar UEFA results
1984–85 UEFA Cup Results at RSSSF.com

FK Željezničar Sarajevo
Željezničar Sarajevo
Bosnian football clubs in international competitions